Vitaliy Dmitriyevich Pukhkalo (born 9 September 1992) is a Kazakhstani cross-country skier who competes internationally.
 
He participated at the 2018 Winter Olympics.

Cross-country skiing results
All results are sourced from the International Ski Federation (FIS).

Olympic Games

Distance reduced to 30 km due to weather conditions.

World Championships

World Cup

Season standings

References

External links

1992 births
Living people
Kazakhstani male cross-country skiers
Olympic cross-country skiers of Kazakhstan
Cross-country skiers at the 2018 Winter Olympics
Cross-country skiers at the 2022 Winter Olympics
Competitors at the 2017 Winter Universiade
Universiade silver medalists for Kazakhstan
Universiade medalists in cross-country skiing
21st-century Kazakhstani people